Sergei Dmitriyevich Davydov (born 2 March 1979 in Rostov-on-Don) is a former competitive figure skater who represented Belarus and Russia. For Belarus, he is the 2006 Cup of China silver medalist, two-time Nebelhorn Trophy champion, and eight-time (2001–2008) Belarusian national champion. He competed at two Olympics and placed as high as 7th at the World Championships (2003) and 4th at the European Championships (2007). For Russia, he is the 1998 World Junior silver medalist. After retirement from the competitive figure skating Davydov became a coach.

Life and career 
Early in his career, Davydov competed for Russia. He won the silver medal at the 1998 World Junior Championships.

Davydov moved from Samara, Russia to Vitebsk, Belarus in 1999 and began competing for Belarus. He was coached by Nina Ruchkina in Vitebsk. After the 2000–01 season, he moved to Moscow, Russia to train with Elena Tchaikovskaia and Vladimir Kotin. He competed at the Olympics twice, placing 21st at the 2002 Winter Olympics and 15th at the 2006 Winter Olympics.

Davydov retired from competitive skating following the 2007–08 season.

Coaching Career 
Following his retirement, Davydov began working as a coach at the CSKA Moscow. His current and former students include:

 Katsiarina Pakhamovich 
 Valeria Mikhailova
 Ekaterina Mitrofanova
 Anna Tarusina 
 Anna Frolova
 Sofia Samodelkina
 Ksenia Tsibinova
 Maria Gordeeva
 Lev Lazarev

Programs

Competitive highlights
GP: Grand Prix; JGP: Junior Series (Junior Grand Prix)

Results for Belarus

Results for Russia

References

External links

 

1979 births
Living people
Sportspeople from Rostov-on-Don
Belarusian male single skaters
Russian male single skaters
Figure skaters at the 2002 Winter Olympics
Figure skaters at the 2006 Winter Olympics
Olympic figure skaters of Belarus
World Junior Figure Skating Championships medalists
Competitors at the 2001 Winter Universiade
20th-century Russian people
21st-century Belarusian people